Lyu Haotian (born 29 November 1997) is a snooker player from the People's Republic of China, notable for being one of the youngest snooker players to have played in professional tournaments, aged only 14. He reached the quarter-finals of the 2012 International Championship when he was aged 14, which is still the record in a ranking event.

Career

Early career 
Lyu Haotian began playing when he was 10 years' old and attracted the attention of local coach Pang Weiguo, himself a former professional player. After 8 months he made his first century break. On November 28, 2009, the day before his 11th birthday, he became China's youngest U18 champion by defeating Lyu Chenwei 4-2.

Lyu first broke onto the professional snooker scene as a wildcard in the 2012 Haikou World Open, losing 4–5 to Tom Ford in the wildcard round.
In his next tournament, the 2012 China Open, he lost again in the wildcard round 2–5 to Peter Ebdon.

2012/2013 season 
At the start of the 2012/2013 season Lyu won his first ever competitive match in a professional tournament by beating Qiu Yalong 4–1 in the first Asian Players Tour Championship. He then narrowly lost 3–4 to Tom Ford in the last 64.
In the 2012 Shanghai Masters, at the age of 14, he became the youngest ever player to win a televised match by beating Marco Fu 5–4 in the wildcard round. He then lost 2–5 to Mark Allen in the first round.

At the 2012 International Championship in China he reached the quarter-finals with a 6–5 defeat of Dominic Dale of Wales in the last 16, before losing 2–6 to former world champion Neil Robertson. He thus became the youngest player ever to reach this stage of a ranking event.

Lyu followed up this result by winning the Chinese Youth Championship, beating Zhao Xintong 3-1 in the final.

In February 2013, he reached the first round of the 2013 World Open beating professional player Simon Bedford 5–2 in the wildcard round before losing 0–5 to Mark Selby.
Lyu also reached the first round of the 2013 China Open courtesy of the withdrawal of Mark Joyce in the wildcard round. He lost 2–5 to Mark Williams.

In July, Lyu won the IBSF World Under-21 Snooker Championship, beating the Mongolian Zhu Yinghui 9-6, to receive a two-year card for the 2013/14 and 2014/15 seasons.

Professional debut 
Lyu Haotian arrived in the UK as the youngest professional of the 2013-14 season, aged just 15. He stayed in Sheffield, playing at the STAR Academy. Lyu started his first season by beating Rod Lawler 5–2 to qualify for the Wuxi Classic where he faced Craig Steadman and won 5–3 to progress into the last 32. He was then whitewashed 5–0 by Ali Carter in the subsequent round. He also qualified for the Indian Open, but lost 4–1 to Thanawat Thirapongpaiboonin the first round.

Two of Lyu's flatmates, Thanawat Tirapongpaiboon and Passakorn Suwannawat, were suspended following an investigation into match fixing at the International Championship. The two players returned to Thailand, but 4 days later their house was set on fire in an arson attack. Lyu Haotian was unharmed, but the trauma had a significant effect on the 15-year old as he struggled to adapt to life in the UK. He became withdrawn and demotivated.

In October, Lyu reached the first final of his career at the minor-ranking Zhengzhou Open in his homeland. He beat the likes of 2006 world champion Graeme Dott and 2013 Shanghai Masters runner-up Xiao Guodong, before losing 4–0 to Liang Wenbo having been edged out of the opening two frames. Lyu was narrowly beaten 6–5 by Marcus Campbell in the first round of the UK Championship despite leading 3–1 at the interval. His final in Asia saw him qualify for the Players Tour Championship Finals for the first time and he lost 4–1 to Mark Williams in the opening round.

Lyu ended his debut season on the main tour ranked world number 93.

2014/2015 season 
At the UK Championship, Lyu defeated Cao Yupeng 6–4 before losing 6–1 to Marco Fu in the second round. He qualified for the Indian Open thanks to a 4–2 win over Dominic Dale and, after coming through a wildcard match in New Delhi, he was eliminated 4–1 in the first round by Tian Pengfei. Overall, Lyu could not recapture his form of last season as he won just two matches in three Asian Tour events and none in five European Tour events which contributed to his relegation from the snooker tour at the end of the season as he finished it 81st in the world rankings. In a subsequent interview he reflected he had been too young, and had become lonely and disoriented living in England without speaking much English.

2015/2016 season 
After the disappointment of relegation from the main tour, Lyu stopped playing snooker for 6 months. His boyhood coach, Pang Weiguo, persuaded him that at 18 he still had a future in the game, and Lyu resumed 9-ball Pool and snooker. He played in the Haining Open, where he overcame Mike Dunn 4–2, Sanderson Lam 4–1 and Ma Bing 4–2, before losing 4–1 to Ricky Walden in the fourth round.

In December 2015 Lyu played in the Chinese Youth Tour, losing to Zhou Yuelong in the quarter-finals.

 
In January, Lyu won the China City Snooker Club League singles title, beating Luo Honghao 5–0 in the final. 

He entered Q School, but failed to win enough games to rejoin the tour.

2016/2017 season 
Lyu continued to achieve strong results in domestic snooker and 9-ball pool. On 12 January, Lyu made a maximum 147 break in a China City Snooker Club League match, playing for Zhejiang Jiaxing club.

Encouraged by Pang Weiguo, Lyu entered the 2017 Asian Championship, and on 28 April 2017 won the ACBS Asian Snooker Championship held in Doha, beating Pankaj Advani in the final 6–3. As a result, he qualified for the 2017-18 tour.

2017/2018 season 
Lyu's first wins came in qualifying rounds for the European Masters and the Shanghai Masters.

Lyu won a gold medal in the 2017 Asian Indoor and Martial Arts Games in Ashgabat, Turkmenistan, playing 9-ball pool scotch doubles with experienced partner Liu Haitao. 
 Lyu also played in six-reds events in Ashgabat and Bangkok.

Returning to snooker, he narrowly lost 4–3 in the second round of the European Masters to world champion Mark Selby.

In the Northern Ireland Open, Lyu produced the best result of his career to date. With wins against Joe Swail, Yuan Sijun, Thepchaiya Un-Nooh, Liam Highfield and Tian Pengfei he progressed to the semi-final, where he lost to fellow Chinese teenager Yan Bingtao 6–2.

In the UK Championship, a trio of wins against experienced players Anthony Hamilton, Peter Ebdon and Marco Fu took him to the last 16, where he lost to Mark Joyce 6–4.

Lyu started 2018 with a win in the qualifying tournament for the China Open, against in-form player Ryan Day 6–3. In the main event he progressed to the last 16 with wins over Liam Highfield and Fergal O'Brien before losing to the eventual winner, World Champion Mark Selby.

At the qualifying for the 2018 World Snooker Championship he beat Fang Xiongman 10–8, before playing Martin O'Donnell. He fell behind 5–9, before winning 5 straight frames to take the match 10–9. In the final round he continued his run by beating Rory McLeod 10–2, winning the last 9 frames, to qualify for the main event at the Crucible for the first time.

At the Crucible he was drawn against Marco Fu, who had not competed for 4 months due to eye surgery. Lyu won the match 10–5, scoring two century breaks, becoming the youngest player to win a match at the Crucible since Ronnie O'Sullivan in 1995. In the second round he faced Barry Hawkins. Despite trailing 4-0 and 8–3, he levelled the scores at 9-9, but ultimately lost 13–10.

Lyu finished the season with £94000 prize money, ranking him 30th on the one-year list, and 61st on the official two-year list, easily the highest of all players in the first year of a new 2-year tour card.

Lyu Haotian was one of only two players (the other being Masters Champion Mark Allen) to reach the last-16 of the World Championship, UK Championship and China Open, the three most important ranking tournaments in the 2017–18 season.

2018/2019 season 
Lyu reached his second ranking semi-final in the China Championship, in Guangzhou in September, beating Joe Perry, Shaun Murphy and Martin O'Donnell, before losing 6–3 to John Higgins. After this, his form collapsed, losing 7 of his next 8 matches, his only win being against his practice partner Fan Zhengyi in the Scottish Open. However, at the Indian Open in March, he produced his best result to date, beating Zhou Yuelong, Luke Simmonds, Andy Hicks, Mark Davis and Anthony Hamilton to reach his first ranking final. However, after leading 3–2, he lost to Matthew Selt 5–3. The result lifted him into the top 32 in the rankings for the first time. In the World Championship, after rare a 10-0 demolition of Jordan Brown, he lost 10–8 to Mark Davis in the final qualifying round.

2019/2020 season 
Lyu's season was marred by technical issues, and some agonising losses. His best result came in the 2020 Snooker Shoot Out, where he reached the semi-final, losing to his flatmate Zhou Yuelong. Towards the end of the season he had wins against Mark Williams (in the Championship League) and Mark Selby (in the Gibraltar Open).

In March, the snooker season was suspended due to the COVID-19 outbreak and Lyu Haotian returned to China. He returned to the UK for the World Championship, but lost 6-2 to Eden Sharav. He finished the season ranked 43.

2020/2021 season 
Lyu's form improved from the previous season. He reached the third round of the European Masters, only losing narrowly to Ding Junhui. His best result came in the Scottish Open, in which he defeated Gary Wilson, Alan McManus, Akani Songsermsawad, before losing to the eventual champion Mark Selby.

In the inaurgural WST Pro Series, Lyu Haotian successfully qualified for the second stage, winning his first 6 mini-matches, including a 2–0 victory over reigning World Champion Ronnie O'Sullivan.

In the World Championship, Lyu beat fellow Chinese players Gao Yang and Chang Bingyu to qualify for the Crucible for a second time. However, his break-off shot in the first frame hit the blue, and his opponent Mark Allen cleared the table with a 139 break. This set the tone for the match, which was won by Allen 10–2. Lyu finished the season ranked 53.

2021/2022 season 
Lyu's results were again inconsistent. His best results were to reach the 3rd round on the Northern Ireland Open, beating Allister Carter and Mark King, and the 4th round of the Gibraltar Open, beating Allan Taylor, Ross Muir and Michael Georgiou.

In the World Championship Lyu Haotian had victories over Xu Si 6-4, Lu Ning 6-3 and Dominic Dale 10-4 to qualify for the main event at the Crucible Theatre for the third time. There he faced Stuart Bingham, but lost 10-5. Lyu finished the season ranked 45.

Personal life 
Lyu Haotian lives in Sheffield where he practices at the Victoria Snooker Academy with Zhao Xintong, Yan Bingtao, Fan Zhengyi and several other players.

Performance and rankings timeline

Career finals

Ranking finals: 1

Minor-ranking finals: 1

Amateur finals: 2 (2 titles)

References

External links 

Lyu Haotian at worldsnooker.com

Living people
Chinese snooker players
1997 births
Sportspeople from Beijing
Competitors at the 2013 World Games
21st-century Chinese people